The Men's omnium at the 2011 UCI Track Cycling World Championships was held on March 25 and 26. 22 athletes participated in the contest. There were six events held.

Results

Flying Lap
The Flying lap was held at 14:55.

Points Race
The Points Race was held at 16:00.

Elimination Race
The Elimination Race was held at 21:50.

Individual Pursuit
The Individual Pursuit was held at 10:30.

Scratch Race
The Scratch Race was held at 15:10.

Time Trial
The Time Trial was held at 16:35.

Standings

References

2011 UCI Track Cycling World Championships
UCI Track Cycling World Championships – Men's omnium